The Crimson Rivers is a French-Belgian-German crime thriller television series created by Jean-Christophe Grangé and follows Grangé's 1997 novel Blood Red Rivers and its 2000 film adaption. It has been broadcast in Romandy since 6 September 2018 on RTS 1, in Belgium and France, since 26 November 2018 on France 2, and in Germany since 5 November 2018 on ZDF.

Synopsis 
Following the events in Guernon, Commissioner Pierre Niemans (Olivier Marchal) is transferred to head the Central Office Against Crimes of Blood (OCCS). He teams up with a former and best student Camille Delaunay (Erika Sainte). The commissioner considers her as his daughter. Together they will solve the most difficult investigations.

Cast

Main
Olivier Marchal: Commissioner Pierre Niemans (seasons 1–3), a legend of the French police, despite certain tensions with his hierarchy and his sometimes dubious respect for protocol. Without a wife or a child, Niemans gives body and soul to his investigations and never gives up, always pushing his own limits. But beneath his rigid cop looks hides a generous, deeply good man who has spent his life tracking down the evil side of man.
Erika Sainte: Lieutenant Camille Delaunay (seasons 1–3), is Niemans' female counterpart, who is a lieutenant and his best student at the police academy and treats her as the daughter he never had, and she crosses paths with him during investigations that seals into an elite tandem. Beneath her energetic traits, she is meticulous and fierce. Her love and admiration for Niemans make her a staunch ally, who doesn't hesitate to risk her life for the one who taught her everything.

Recurring and guest

Season 1

Season 2

Season 3

Production

Development
In December 2015, it was announced the adaptation of the novel Blood Red Rivers by Jean-Christophe Grangé as a television series screened by EuropaCorp with the German production company Maze Pictures as its co-producer.

Casting
In July 2017, Olivier Marchal was chosen to play the character of commissioner Pierre Niemans. Grangé originally wanted Jean Reno in the series, but "everyone considered that he was too old for the role" as he explained in an interview, in November 2018.

The actress Erika Sainte is chosen by the author for the role of Lieutenant Camille Delaunay, after spotting her in the series Baron Noir.

Filming locations

Season 1
Filming began in November 2017 in Namur Province, Walloon Brabant and in Brussels, Belgium. The religious site visible in many scenes is the former Abbey of Marche-les-Dames.

"The Day of the Ashes" were partially filmed in the city of Tournai (in particular on the forecourt of the cathedral) and in Hainaut. The Liège-Guillemins railway station appears at the start of the episode. The chapel is located in Marcourt, in the province of Luxembourg, where it is the hermitage of Saint-Thibaut.

"The Children's Crusade" was shot partly in the Charleroi region. The Collège du Christ-Roi in Ottignies serves as the backdrop for the Saint Vincent Institute.

The Province of Namur serves as the backdrop for "The Last Hunt": the Château Bayard (in Éghezée) as well as a modernist villa from 1927, in a  wooded park in Blaimont (in Hastière), located a few kilometres from the French border and Dinant.

In "Songs of Darkness", some scenes were shot at the hotel "Les trois 3 clés" in Gembloux. The CBR building in Watermael-Boitsfort, a building by Belgian architect Constantin Brodzki, inaugurated in the early 1970s, was selected for the scenes of the police station.

Season 2
The shooting of "Holy Theft" took place in Haute-Savoie, partly at the Château of Avenières in Cruseilles, as well as in Sainte-Croix-en-Jarez and in the woods of Vézelin-sur-Loire, in Loire.

Season 3
The shooting of "Lune noire" took place in Picardy, partly in Ault-Onival, its cliffs, the esplanade under the storm, and the former Derloche-Cantevelle locksmith factory which transformed into a gendarmerie, and mainly in Hesdin – Pas-de-Calais in the villa Debruyne, also called “Château Dalle”, bequeathed in 2016 with its  park to the town of Hesdin.

For "XXY", the shooting took place in Vresse-sur-Semois, Belgium, in August 2020.

Episode list

English episode titles of Seasons 1 and 2 come from the on-demand services All 4 and SBS On Demand.

Season 1

Season 2
A second season was announced on 17 December 2018. It is broadcast over four evenings, in January 2020.

Season 3

Season 4

International broadcasts 
In the United Kingdom, it aired on More4 on 11 January 2019 as part of Walter Presents. The second season aired on 20 August 2021.

In Australia, it was released on SBS' on-demand service SBS On Demand on the 26 December 2019; it aired on the main channel on 14 April 2021. Season 2 was released in March 2020 in the streaming service; and later aired on television on 6 December of the following year in SBS.

Awards and nominations

Awards
Polar Festival of Cognac 2019: French-language Television Film Grand Prize for "Kenbaltyu" (Season 2, Episodes 11 and 12 by David Morley).
2020 UCMF Award for Best Fiction TV Music for composer David Reyes, for his work on Season 2.

Nominations
La Rochelle TV Fiction Festival 2018: Presentation of "The Day of the Ashes"
Nominated at the MASA Awards 2019: Best Main Title Music for a Television Series (David Reyes).

References and notes

References

Notes
1. Guernon is a fictional town in the Alps created for the novel Blood Red Rivers. It is also present in the film adaptation.

See also
Blood Red Rivers, 1998 novel by Jean-Christophe Grangé
The Crimson Rivers, 2000 film directed by Mathieu Kassovitz and starring Jean Reno and Vincent Cassel
Crimson Rivers II: Angels of the Apocalypse, 2004 sequel directed by Olivier Dahan and starring Reno and Benoît Magimel

External links

2018 French television series debuts
2018 Belgian television series debuts
2018 German television series debuts
French crime drama television series
2010s French television series
2020s French television series
France Télévisions crime television series
Television shows based on French novels